Protein TRS85 homolog is a protein that in humans is encoded by the KIAA1012 gene.

References

Further reading